Szatkowski (feminine: Szatkowska) is a Polish locational surname, which is a variant of Szadkowski and means a person from a place in Poland called Szadek, Szadki or Szadkowice. Alternative spellings include  Szatkowsky, Schatkowski and Schatkowsky. The surname may refer to:

Anna Szatkowska (1928–2015), Polish writer
Henryk Szatkowski, German politician
Rob Szatkowski (born 1970), American wrestler
Tomasz Szatkowski (born 1978), Polish politician and political scientist
Zuzanna Szadkowski (born 1978), American actress

References

Polish-language surnames